The Copa del Generalísimo 1970 Final was the 68th final of the King's Cup. The final was played at Camp Nou in Barcelona, on 28 June 1970, being won by Real Madrid, who beat Valencia 3–1.

Details

References

1970
Copa
Real Madrid CF matches
Valencia CF matches